Ramuntxo Camblong (11 November 1939 – 12 November 2021) was a French-Basque politician.

Biography
Camblong studied in Paris and Angers and taught electronics, mathematics, and physics in Hasparren from 1966 to 1975. He was in charge of external development for Sokoa SA from 1998 to 2002.

Political career
The organization promoted enterprises in the French Basque Country with support from the Mondragon Corporation.

Camblong was elected to the Municipal Council of Anglet in 2001, where he served until 2008. He was also notably President of the Basque Nationalist Party of France from 2004 to 2008.

Ramuntxo Camblong died on 12 November 2021, at the age of 82.

Awards
 (2012)

References

1939 births
2021 deaths
Basque Nationalist Party politicians
People from Labourd
French Basque politicians
Eusko Alkartasuna Party politicians
French schoolteachers